Weiman is a surname. Notable people with the surname include:

Duane Weiman (1946–2015), Canadian educator and political figure
Rita Weiman (1885–1954), American playwright, journalist, author, and screenwriter
Tyler Weiman (born 1984), Canadian ice hockey player

See also
Weimann